Chiltern Green is a hamlet located in Bedfordshire, England. It is in the civil parish of Hyde.

The settlement lent its name to Chiltern Green railway station, which was located in nearby New Mill End. The railway station closed in 1952. Today London Luton Airport is located to the north west of Chiltern Green.

Hamlets in Bedfordshire
Central Bedfordshire District